Boneh-ye Fathali (also Romanized as Boneh-ye Fatḥʿalī) is a village in Shalal and Dasht-e Gol Rural District, in the Central District of Andika County, Khuzestan Province, Iran. At the 2006 census, its population was 37, in 7 families.

References 

Populated places in Andika County